Lugs are the loops (or protuberances) that exist on both arms of a hinge, featuring a hole for the axis of the hinge.

Hinges